This list contains all cultural property of national significance (class A) in the canton of Jura from the 2009 Swiss Inventory of Cultural Property of National and Regional Significance. It is sorted by municipality and contains 29 individual buildings, 6 collections and 11 archaeological finds.

The geographic coordinates provided are in the Swiss coordinate system as given in the Inventory.

Alle

Basse-Allaine

Boncourt

Bourrignon

Clos du Doubs

Coeuve

Cornol

Courgenay

Courrendlin

Courroux

Delémont

Fahy

Haute-Ajoie

Haute-Sorne

La Baroche

La Chaux-des-Breuleux

Le Bémont

Le Noirmont

Les Breuleux

Les Genevez

Muriaux

Pleigne

Porrentruy

Rocourt

Saignelégier

Saint-Brais

Val Terbi

References
 All entries, addresses and coordinates are from:

External links
 Swiss Inventory of Cultural Property of National and Regional Significance, 2009 edition:

PDF documents: Class B objects
Geographic information system